William Hawksworth  (3 March 1911 – 14 July 1966) was a New Zealand cricketer and doctor.

Life and career
Hawksworth was born in Nelson and educated at Nelson College from 1925 to 1928. He went on to study medicine at the University of Otago, graduating MB ChB in 1935. He won the university medal for obstetrics.

He played twelve first-class matches for Otago between 1929 and 1934. He represented Otago as a wicket-keeper while studying in Dunedin, but played no first-class cricket after graduating as a doctor in 1935.

He worked as house surgeon at New Plymouth Hospital before moving to London in the late 1930s to continue his studies. He married Roberta Jolliffe of Wellington in London in July 1940.

Hawksworth served in the Medical Corps of the Second New Zealand Expeditionary Force in World War II. He served in North Africa, Greece, Crete and Italy, commanding a field ambulance. He was awarded the OBE for his services.

After the war he returned to England. He became a consultant obstetrician and gynaecologist to the United Oxford Hospitals. In 1959 he received the degree of MA Oxon as a Fellow of University College. He served on the Council of the Royal College of Obstetricians and Gynaecologists for six years.

Hawksworth died in Oxford after a short illness in July 1966, survived by his widow, a son and two daughters.

See also
 List of Otago representative cricketers

References

External links
 

1911 births
1966 deaths
New Zealand cricketers
Otago cricketers
Cricketers from Nelson, New Zealand
People educated at Nelson College
University of Otago alumni
New Zealand Officers of the Order of the British Empire
New Zealand military personnel of World War II
20th-century New Zealand medical doctors
Fellows of University College, Oxford